Gelechia invenustella is a moth of the family Gelechiidae. It is found in Argentina.

The wingspan is about 19 mm. The forewings are ash-grey with two ill-defined black dots in the middle of the cell and some dark streaks. The hindwings are brownish grey.

References

Moths described in 1876
Gelechia